Eddie Wainwright (22 June 1924 – 30 September 2005) was an English footballer who played in the Football League for Everton and Rochdale.

Wainwright first signed for Everton in 1939, but his first professional appearance was after World War II. In the 1949-50 season he was the leading goal scorer.

In 1951 he suffered a serious leg injury which almost ended his career, but he returned for four more seasons with Everton.

In 1956, Wainwright transferred to Rochdale, where he made exactly 100 league appearances over 3 seasons, before his retirement.

Wainwright died on 30 September 2005.

References

External links
 

English footballers
English Football League players
1924 births
2005 deaths
Everton F.C. players
Rochdale A.F.C. players
Association football forwards